Pocono Creek is a  tributary of Brodhead Creek in the Poconos of eastern Pennsylvania in the United States.

Pocono Creek joins Brodhead Creek in Stroudsburg.

Pocono is a Native American name purported to mean "a stream between two mountains".

See also
List of rivers of Pennsylvania

References

External links
U.S. Geological Survey: PA stream gaging stations

Rivers of Pennsylvania
Pocono Mountains
Tributaries of Brodhead Creek
Rivers of Monroe County, Pennsylvania